Saratoga County Airport  is a county-owned, public-use airport located three nautical miles (6 km) southwest of the central business district of Saratoga Springs, a city in Saratoga County, New York, United States. It is included in the National Plan of Integrated Airport Systems for 2011–2015, which categorized it as a general aviation facility.

Facilities and aircraft 
Saratoga County Airport covers an area of 300 acres (121 ha) at an elevation of 433 feet (132 m) above mean sea level. It has two runways with asphalt and concrete surfaces: 5/23 is 4,699 by 100 feet (1,432 x 30 m); 14/32 is 4,000 by 100 feet (1,219 x 30 m). Jet aircraft use runways 5 or 23.

For the 12-month period ending August 29, 2008, the airport had 38,550 aircraft operations, an average of 105 per day: 96% general aviation, 4% air taxi, and <1% military. At that time there were 62 aircraft based at this airport: 63% single-engine, 26% glider, 8% multi-engine, 2% jet, and 2% helicopter.

Nearby airports 
Nearby airports with instrument approach procedures include:
 SCH – Schenectady County Airport (12 nm S)
 ALB – Albany International Airport (18 nm S)
 GFL – Floyd Bennett Memorial Airport (21 nm NE)
 NY0 – Fulton County Airport (21 nm W)
 DDH – William H. Morse State Airport  (29 nm E)

Other nearby facilities:
 W57 – Round Lake Airport and Seaplane Base (8.3 nm SE)
 K27 – Burrello-Mechanicville Airport (12.7 nm SE)

References

External links
  at New York State DOT Airport Directory
 Aerial image as of April 1995 from USGS The National Map
 
 

Airports in New York (state)
Transportation buildings and structures in Saratoga County, New York